Begli Annageldiyev (born 24 May 1984) is a Turkmen professional footballer. He last played for HTTU Asgabat as a defender. He was the 2007 Turkmenistan Player of the Year and was called up for his country's FIFA World Cup 2010 qualifying campaign.

References

External links

1984 births
Living people
Turkmenistan footballers
Turkmenistan international footballers
Association football defenders
Place of birth missing (living people)